Bouchercon is an annual convention of creators and devotees of mystery and detective fiction. It is named in honour of writer, reviewer, and editor Anthony Boucher; also the inspiration for the Anthony Awards, which have been issued at the convention since 1986. This page details Bouchercon XXXIII and the 17th Anthony Awards ceremony.

Bouchercon
The convention was held in Austin, Texas on October 17, 2002; running until the 20th. The event was chaired by owner of the "Crime and Space" mystery bookstore, Willie Siros; and Karen Meschke, both co-founders of the Alamo Literary Arts Maintenance Organization.

Special Guests
Guests of Honor — Mary Willis Walker, George Pelecanos
Fan Guest of Honor — Bill Crider
Fan Ghost of Honor — Barry Gardner
Toastmaster — Sparkle Hayter

Anthony Awards
The following list details the awards distributed at the seventeenth annual Anthony Awards ceremony.

Novel award
Winner:
Dennis Lehane, Mystic River

Shortlist:
Jan Burke, Flight
Harlan Coben, Tell No One
Rick Riordan, The Devil Went Down to Austin
S. J. Rozan, Reflecting the Sky

First novel award
Winner:
C. J. Box, Open Season

Shortlist:
K. J. Erickson, Third Person Singular
Jan Grape, Austin City Blue
Denise Hamilton, The Jasmine Trade
Andy Straka, A Witness Above

Paperback original award
Winner:
Charlaine Harris, Dead Until Dark

Shortlist:
Jeff Abbott, A Kiss Gone Bad
Jerrilyn Farmer, Dim Sum Dead
P. J. Parrish, Dead of Winter
Daniel Stashower, The Houdini Specter

Short story award
Winner:
Bill and Judy Crider, "Chocolate Moose", from Death Dines at 8:30

Shortlist:
Ted Hertel Jr., "My Bonnie Lies...", from The Mammoth Book of Legal Thrillers
Rochelle Krich, "Bitter Waters", from Criminal Kabbalah: An Intriguing Anthology of Jewish Mystery & Detective Fiction
Margaret Maron, "Virgo in Sapphires", from Ellery Queen's Mystery Magazine December 2001
S. J. Rozan, "Double-Crossing Delancy", from Mystery Street

Critical / Non-fiction award
Winner:
Tony Hillerman, Seldom Disappointed: A Memoir

Shortlist:
Max Allan Collins, The History of Mystery
Jo Hammett, Dashiell Hammett: A Daughter Remembers
G. Miki Hayden, Writing The Mystery: A Start to Finish Guide for Both Novice and Professional
Jeffrey Marks, Who Was That Lady? Craig Rice: The Queen of Screwball Mystery

Young adult award
Winner:
Penny Warner, The Mystery of the Haunted Caves

Shortlist:
Michael Dahl, The Viking Claw
Harriet R. Feder, Death on Sacred Ground
Peni Griffin, Ghost Sitter
Jeri Fink & Donna Paltrowitz, Matthew's Web

Cover art award
Winner:
Josef Beck & Michael Storrings; for S. J. Rozan, Reflecting the Sky

Shortlist:
Glenn Harrington; for Carole Nelson Douglas, Chapel Noir
Annie Sperling; for Kit Sloane, Grape Noir
Teresa Fasolino; for Rosemary Stevens, The Tainted Snuff Box
John Warden & Anthony Ramondo; for Michael McGarrity, Under the Color of Law

Special service award
Winner:
Doris Ann Norris

Shortlist:

No shortlist released

References

Anthony Awards
33
2002 in Texas